Zagora Airport  is an airport serving Zagora, Morocco.

The Zagora non-directional beacon (Ident: FJA) is located on the field.

Airlines and destinations
The following airlines operate regular scheduled and charter flights at Zagora Airport:

See also
Transport in Morocco
List of airports in Morocco

References

External links
 OpenStreetMap - Zagora
 SkyVector - Zagora

Airports in Morocco
Buildings and structures in Drâa-Tafilalet
2009 establishments in Morocco
21st-century architecture in Morocco